Charity Gaye Finnestad (born June 30, 1973) is an American author known for the blog she kept from April 2007 to April 2008, which documented her adventures living and dating in Hollywood, called Hollywood in Heels. The blog was subsequently turned into a book by the same name. Hollywood in Heels was released digitally in April 2012 and published in hardcover on September 13, 2013.

Early life and education
Finnestad was born on June 30, 1973, in Bellingham, Washington, to Chris and Betty Finnestad. Growing up, she moved with her family to Omaha, Nebraska, Seattle, Washington, British Columbia, Greely, Colorado, and finally landed in Sisters, Oregon, where she attended junior high and high school. In 1994 Finnestad graduated summa cum laude from Eugene Bible College (now New Hope Christian College) with a degree in religion and education. She is the oldest of four children.

Personal life
In 2002, Finnestad moved to Los Angeles to write professionally. On January 8, 2008 in San Francisco, Finnestad married Robert Henry Kondrk. Kondrk is VP of Content for Apple's iTunes. The couple currently lives in the Hollywood Hills with their young sons Talbot and Theo Kondrk.

Career
When Finnestad finished college, she spent several years modeling and doing odd jobs. Her blog Hollywood in Heels (published from April 2007- April 2008) was her first public foray into writing. She later wrote the book version of Hollywood in Heels. In April 2012 the digital release of Hollywood in Heels was noted by Perez Hilton, Life and Style magazine, and Nylon). SkyHorse Publishing will release it in hardcover format on September 13, 2013.

References

American bloggers
American women bloggers
Living people
1973 births
People from Sisters, Oregon
21st-century American women